The Yokohama Grits are a professional ice hockey team based in Yokohama, Japan. They are a members of Asia League Ice Hockey and play their home games at the KOSÉ Shin-Yokohama Skate Center.

History
The Yokohama Grits were founded on 2 May 2019 by Grits Sports Innovators Corporation, an organisation led by Akihito Usui. The Grits are the first ice hockey team based in the Greater Tokyo Area since the Seibu Prince Rabbits folded in 2009. On 2 June 2020 the team was announced as the eighth member of Asia League Ice Hockey, with former NHL player Mike Kennedy serving as the head coach. Due to the COVID-19 pandemic in Asia, the league cancelled its planned 2020–21 season, and a three-country Asia League tournament was scheduled instead. In October of the same year, the Grits took part in the Asia League Japan Cup.

References

External links
 Yokohama Grits 

Asia League Ice Hockey teams
Ice hockey clubs established in 2019
Ice hockey teams in Japan
Sports teams in Yokohama
2019 establishments in Japan